Tombulu, also known as Minahasan language, is an Austronesian language of northern Sulawesi in Indonesia. It is a Minahasan language, a sub-group of the Philippine languages.

It is a local language of the Minahasa people spoken in the city of Tomohon and in the villages under the Kota Tomohon administration such as Rurukan, Pinaras, Kumelembuai, Woloan, and Tara-Tara. It is also spoken in the villages under the administration of the Minahasa Regency in the Tombulu district, Tombariri district, Pineleng district, and two villages in the Sonder district, namely Rambunan and Sawangan.

Phonology

Consonants

Vowels

Vocabulary 

The Tombulu language is unique among the Minahasan languages in its pronunciation of the letter .

Phrases & examples

Status 
The Tombulu language is in critical need of revitalization. It is not being spoken as a first language in highly populated areas such as Tomohon, Pineleng, and Tanawangko. Traditionally Tombulu-speaking villages such as Woloan, Tara-Tara, Lolah, and Lemoh are not so today. The Board of Education of the Indonesian government has not offered any help either to the Tombulu language or any other local languages that are in decline. , if available, is a daily class which most provinces in Indonesia use to teach the new generations the local languages.

Tombulu is still spoken in villages such as Kayawu, Rurukan, Kumelembuai, Pinaras, Suluan, Kembes, Tombuluan, Rumengkor, Kali, Tondangow, Sawangan, and Rambunan all the way to the children. Once every month, it is used in sermons in local churches.

At the beginning of 2013, an Indonesian-Tombulu dictionary was first released. A New Testament version of the Bible in Tombulu language was released in November 2018.

References

Languages of Sulawesi
Minahasan languages